Army Tomaini (February 5, 1918 – May 25, 2005) was an American football tackle. He played for the New York Giants in 1945.

His brother Johnny Tomaini also played professional football.

He died on May 25, 2005, in Tallahassee, Florida at age 87.

References

1918 births
2005 deaths
American football tackles
Catawba Indians football players
New York Giants players
Long Branch High School alumni
Players of American football from New Jersey
Sportspeople from Long Branch, New Jersey